A trackback allows one website to notify another about an update. It is one of four types of linkback methods for website authors to request notification when somebody links to one of their documents. This enables authors to keep track of who is linking to their articles. Some weblog software, such as SilverStripe, WordPress, Drupal, and Movable Type, supports automatic pingbacks where all the links in a published article can be pinged when the article is published.  The term is used colloquially for any kind of linkback.

History
The TrackBack specification was created by Six Apart, which first implemented it in its  Movable Type blogging software in August 2002. The TrackBack has since been implemented in most other blogging tools. Six Apart started a working group in February 2006 to improve the Trackback protocol with the goal to eventually have it approved as an Internet standard by the IETF.  One notable blogging service that does not support trackback is Blogger.  Instead, Blogger provides "backlinks", which allow users to employ Google's search infrastructure to show links between blog entries.

Function
A trackback is an acknowledgment. This acknowledgment is sent via a network signal (XML-RPC ping) from the originating site to the receiving site. The receptor often publishes a link back to the originator indicating its worthiness.  Trackback requires both sites to be trackback-enabled in order to establish this communication.

Trackbacks are used primarily to facilitate communication between blogs; if a blogger writes a new entry commenting on, or referring to, an entry found at another blog, and both blogging tools support the TrackBack protocol, then the commenting blogger can notify the other blog with a "TrackBack ping"; the receiving blog will typically display summaries of, and links to, all the commenting entries below the original entry. This allows for conversations spanning several blogs that readers can easily follow.

Software support
Blogging software that supports the TrackBack protocol displays a "TrackBack URL" with every entry. This URL is used by the commenting blogger, whose software will send XML-formatted information about the new entry to this URL. Some blogging tools are able to discover these TrackBack URLs automatically, others require the commenting blogger to enter them manually.

Spam

Some individuals or companies have abused the TrackBack feature to insert spam links on some blogs.  This is similar to comment spam but avoids some of the safeguards designed to stop the latter practice.  As a result, TrackBack spam filters similar to those implemented against comment spam now exist in many weblog publishing systems. Many blogs have stopped using trackbacks because dealing with spam became too much of a burden.

See also

 Linkback, the suite of protocols that allows websites to manually and automatically link to one another
 Pingback, a similar protocol less prone to spam
 Webmention, an alternate implementation of the pingback protocol that avoids the complexities of xmlrpc.
 Refback, another similar protocol
 Referer, identifies the address of the webpage of the resource which links to it
 Search engine optimization
 Sping, short for "spam ping"

References

External links
 Trackback specification 1.2, date 2004-08-01

Blogging
Drupal
WordPress